Ram Falls Provincial Park  is a provincial park in Alberta, Canada, located  south of Nordegg and  west of Rocky Mountain House on Highway 734.

Activities

The following activities are available in the park:
Bird watching (Golden eagles, bald eagles, merlins, American kestrels and American dippers)
Camping
Cross-country skiing and back-country skiing
Fishing (bull trout, westslope cutthroat trout, mountain whitefish)
Front country hiking
Horseback riding (but horses are not permitted in the recreation area)
Off-site OHV and snowmobile riding
Wildlife watching

See also
List of provincial parks in Alberta
List of Canadian provincial parks
List of National Parks of Canada

References

External links

Clearwater County, Alberta
Provincial parks of Alberta